Howard Jarvis (6 February 1903 – 28 June 1964) was a British painter. His work was part of the painting event in the art competition at the 1948 Summer Olympics.

References

1903 births
1964 deaths
20th-century British painters
British male painters
Olympic competitors in art competitions
People from Liverpool
20th-century British male artists